The 7th annual Canadian Screen Awards were held on March 31, 2019, to honour achievements in Canadian film, television, and digital media production in 2018.

Nominations were announced by the Academy of Canadian Cinema and Television on February 7, 2019. Early coverage of the nominations highlighted the fact that the Best Picture category consisted entirely of French-language films from Quebec, with not a single English-language film named in the category. This was also the first year that the ceremony did not have a host.

Ceremony

The awards in many of the technical and craft categories were presented in a series of advance Canadian Screen Week galas in the week before the main ceremony. The gala for non-fiction programming was held on March 26, the gala for creative fiction storytelling was held on March 27, the gala for digital production was held on March 28, and the gala for film craft categories was held in the afternoon of March 31.

The broadcast ceremony had no overall host, with the academy clarifying that the decision was made before the Academy Awards made the same announcement. The ceremony did, however, included pretaped comedy segments from performers such as the casts of Baroness von Sketch Show and Letterkenny, as well as a short welcome introduction by actor Andrew Phung and drag queen Tynomi Banks.

In film, The Great Darkened Days (La grande noirceur) was the year's big winner with five awards, although the Best Picture award went to A Colony (Une colonie). In television, the drama series Anne with an E and Cardinal tied for the most wins, with seven awards each.

Special awards
The first recipients of the academy's special awards were announced on January 15.

Board of Directors Award: Kevin Tierney, Elizabeth Klinck, Carole Vivier, Roman Bittman
Margaret Collier Award: Brad Wright
Industry Leadership Award: Entertainment One
Lifetime Achievement Award: Deepa Mehta
Radius Award: Stephan James
Earle Grey Award: Mary Walsh
Academy Icon Award: The Kids in the Hall

Film

Television

Programs

Acting

News and information

Sports

Craft awards

Directing

Music

Writing

Digital media

References

07
2018 film awards
2018 television awards
2019 in Toronto
2019 in Canadian cinema
2019 in Canadian television
2018 awards in Canada